Andata e ritorno may refer to:
 Andata e ritorno (film), a 1985 documentary film
 Andata e ritorno (TV series), an Italian television series